Just Between Friends is a 1986 American drama film about two women whose friendship is tested by tragedy. The film was written, produced and directed by Allan Burns, and it stars Mary Tyler Moore, Christine Lahti, Ted Danson and Sam Waterston.

Plot
Holly Davis is a wife and mother, happily married to seismologist Chip Davis. She is not aware that he is having an affair with Sandy Dunlap, a television news reporter who interviewed him after an earthquake.

Holly begins teaching aerobics part-time at the gym, where she and Sandy meet by coincidence. Sandy and Holly become fast friends and Holly's children like Sandy as well. Sandy is a career-minded reporter trying to become an anchorwoman. Holly invites Sandy to a dinner at her home. It's then that Sandy realizes her married boyfriend is Holly's husband. Sandy tells Chip it's over, but he begs her to wait until they can talk after his upcoming trip. One day at work, a news bulletin reveals the death of Chip in a car crash.

Holly is devastated by the news and so is Sandy. Helga, the gym's owner, is ready to sell, so Sandy and Holly invest together. Holly learns the truth while clearing out her husband's office where she finds a photo of Sandy and Chip together. She angrily confronts Sandy who tells her that she was unaware that her new friend was the wife of the man she loved until the dinner party, then she ended it. Holly angrily ends their friendship.

Sandy begs for forgiveness, but Holly is devastated, hurt and angry, and refuses to forgive Sandy. Holly swears she will buy Sandy out of her share of the gym as soon as she is able and refuses to resume the close friendship they once shared.

Sandy discovers that she is pregnant, and she tells Holly, who is horrified by the news. Over time, Holly realizes that Sandy's child will also be her husband's child so she decides that she should try to forgive Sandy so that she can be a part of the child's life.  Harry, Chip's co-worker, helps Sandy with her pregnancy. He also sees Holly, always having had a crush on her.  Sandy rejects Holly's attempt at renewing their friendship at first but once the child is born, the film ends as they begin to repair their friendship and Harry kisses Holly.

Cast

 Mary Tyler Moore as Holly Davis
 Christine Lahti as Sandy Dunlap
 Sam Waterston as Harry Crandall
 Ted Danson as Chip Davis
 Mark Blum as George Margolin
 Salome Jens as Helga
 Read Morgan as Charlie
 Beverly Sanders as Judy
 Robert Rothwell as Bill
 Julie Payne as Karen
 Darwyn Carson as Janet
 Andra Akers as Andrea
 Robert Kino as Mr. Hasegawa
 Jane Greer as Ruth Chadwick
 George Wallace as Bob Chadwick
 Cástulo Guerra as Sportscaster
 Lisle Wilson as Newswriter
 Chet Collins as Stage Manager
 Lewis Arquette as TV Station Guard
 Terri Hanauer as Woman in Shower
 Helene Winston as Woman in Ice Cream Shop
 Gary Riley as Clerk in Ice Cream Shop
 Leda Siskind as Coffee Shop Waitress
 Christina Kokubo as Nurse
 Leslie Ann Rieder as Candy Striper

Reception
Just Between Friends received generally negative reviews from critics. The film holds a 33% rating on Rotten Tomatoes based on 6 reviews. Roger Ebert of the Chicago Sun-Times was critical of the film saying it "labors over the smallest points of the most inconsequential scenes and then hurries past the big emotional climaxes".

Home media
Just Between Friends was released on DVD by MGM Home Entertainment on January 13, 2004 as a Region 1 DVD.

References

External links
 
 
 

1986 films
1986 directorial debut films
1986 drama films
1980s English-language films
1980s female buddy films
American drama films
Films about friendship
Films about infidelity
Films shot in Detroit
Films scored by Patrick Williams
Orion Pictures films
MTM Enterprises films
1980s American films